Lord Street is one of the main streets in central Liverpool, England that forms the city's main shopping district. The street is relatively short at less than 300 metres in length, it joins onto Church Street to the east and James Street alongside Derby Square and the Queen Elizabeth II Law Courts. The majority of land to the south of Lord Street is occupied by the Liverpool One complex, whilst the likes of Cavern Walks are located on the north side of the street.

Shopping streets in Liverpool